Tucky Buzzard were a British hard rock band formed in 1969 by three former members of The End. The original lineup was Jimmy Henderson (vocals), Terry Taylor (guitar), David Brown (bass), Paul Francis (drums), and Nick Graham (keyboards). Halfway through recording their debut album, Francis departed from the band and was replaced by Chris Johnson, who recorded the remaining drum parts and was credited on the album sleeve. Tucky Buzzard produced a total of five albums between 1969 and 1973. The band's producer was Bill Wyman of the Rolling Stones.

Terry Taylor has worked on a number of musical compositions with Bill Wyman and has played with him in a number of his bands, Willy and The Poor Boys, Bill Wyman's Rhythm Kings, since he left The Rolling Stones. In 2006 Tucky Buzzard was featured in an article called Top 6 Classic Rock Bands You Never Knew You Didn't Know written  by Dave White.

Albums

Studio albums
Coming on Again (Spain: Hispavox HHS 11-208, 1971)
Tucky Buzzard (US: Capitol ST 787, 1971)
Warm Slash (Capitol E-ST 864, 1971)
Allright on the Night (Purple Records TPSA 7510, 1973)
Buzzard (Purple Records TPSA 7512, 1973)

Compilations
Time Will Be Your Doctor: Rare Recordings 1971–1972 (Castle/Sanctuary CMEDD1249, 2005)
This was an album compiling the band's first three studio albums.

References

External links
Robin Mayhew (Tucky Buzzard's live sound engineer) explains about using Tucky Buzzard's PA to work with David Bowie on his Ziggy Stardust tour in 1972
Bill Wyman's Music Site

English hard rock musical groups
Musical groups established in 1969